Kuato may refer to:
 Kuato Studios, a video game company based in London
 A character in Total Recall (1990 film)